Dalny is a rural locality (a settlement) and the administrative center of Dalny Selsoviet, Rubtsovsky District, Altai Krai, Russia. The population was 649 as of 2013. There are 12 streets.

Geography 
Dalny is located 43 km east of Rubtsovsk (the district's administrative centre) by road. Troinka is the nearest rural locality.

References 

Rural localities in Rubtsovsky District